The Chetniks were the World War II movement led by Draža Mihailović.

Chetniks may also refer to:
 The Serbian Chetnik Organization, active during the Macedonian Struggle
 Chetniks in the Balkan Wars
 Chetniks in occupied Serbia (1916–18)
 Chetniks in the interwar period
 Chetnik (pejorative), an ethnic slur against Serbs
 Members of a Cheta (armed group), armed bands in the Balkans